Kalimuthu s/o Pakirisamy or P. Kalimuthu (January 22, 1961 – June 29, 1993), known professionally as Bentong Kali, was a Malaysian-Tamil criminal and gangster, who gained a national attention in the 1990s. He was implicated in 17 different murders, and terrorized the capital Kuala Lumpur through violence, extortion and heroin smuggling. He also made headlines when he challenged the police to arrest him. He was finally gunned down by Royal Malaysia Police's Special Actions Unit from Bukit Aman, Kuala Lumpur.

Personal life
Bentong Kali was born to a Malaysian Tamil family in Bentong, Pahang. He was the eighth child out of his eleven siblings. He went to school until he dropped out in Form 1.

He was said to have a number of tattoos on his body. He had a 'BORN TO DIE' tattoo on his right hand and a picture of a tiger head on his left hand. On both of his thighs, he had pictures of a naked women tattooed, followed with snake and eagle character tattoos on his back. Bentong Kali also had a surgical scar on the abdomen.

His favourite choice of weapon was his German-made semi-automatic pistol, a SIG Sauer P226.

Criminal career
Bentong Kali’s criminal career started early in his childhood. He was arrested at the age of 14, and imprisoned until being released at the age of 19. He later joined a Chinese triad called 'Gang 04' in his hometown of Bentong. Bentong Kali was active around the capital in Brickfields, Segambut, Sungei Way and Ampang. He was arrested again in July 1985 under the Emergency Ordinance proclamation and jailed at Jerejak Island, Penang, but was released soon after in 1987. He was placed under limited residence restrictions in Kuantan, Pahang.

Bentong Kali returned to the criminal world soon after, setting up his own triad called 'Gang 08' in Jalan Klang Lama, Kuala Lumpur and lastly at Taman Sentosa klang.

Racketeering
Initially, he joined the Chinese triad called 'Gang 04', and subsequently left it and create Indian triad called 'Gang 08'. He was placed under house arrest, but subsequently established his own triad called 'Gang 36 Jalan Klang Lama' in Kuala Lumpur.

Drug-trafficking
'Gang 04' groups were actively involved in trafficking drugs, and for the offense Bentong Kali was arrested again in April 1980 and charged under the Dangerous Drugs Act 1952. However, he was released when there was not enough evidence to convict him. For the second time, he was placed under house arrest in Gopeng, Perak, for two years. Bentong Kali then disappeared in November 1984.

Killing spree
In 1991, Bentong Kali resurfaced, committing a string of murders. It was reported that he was killing for the sake of killing, causing police to launch a special operation called 'Ops Buncit' in June 1993. 'Ops Buncit' was joined by 200 police personnel, including those from Kuala Lumpur, Selangor, and Pahang, who were massively mobilized to hunt down Bentong Kali.

He was known for his hot temper. On 12 June 1993, he attended a family function without being invited. A commotion arose between his accomplices and the guests, and Bentong Kali killed some of the guests in the commotion.

'Ops Buncit'
In an attempt to capture Bentong Kali, posters of him and his crimes were put up in public places all over Malaysia. A bounty of RM100,000 was also advertised as a reward for information that would lead to his capture. His posters were also distributed to neighbouring countries such as Thailand. The manhunt for Bentong Kali was a 24/7 operation throughout the nation.

Death
Police intelligence tracked Bentong Kali to his hideout in a double-storey terraced house in Taming Jaya, Belakong on 29 June 1993. At the break of dawn, an elite team of police officers from the Special Actions Unit from Bukit Aman took positions and surrounded the house. Bentong Kali and his accomplices engaged the officers in a firefight. He was shot in the head and killed; his accomplices also died in the fight.

His remains was laid to rest on 2 July 1993, three days after his death. His last rites was performed by his son.

Legacy
Bentong Kali’s life story was published in a book titled The Story of Bentong Kali: Crime and Society in 90s Kuala Lumpur, written by former New Straits Times journalist, Suganthi Supramaniam published by Gerakbudaya. The book was released on August 23, 2019.

References

1961 births
1993 deaths
Malaysian people of Indian descent
People from Pahang
Malaysian Hindus
Malaysian gangsters